The 1986–87 Cypriot First Division was the 48th season of the Cypriot top-level football league. Omonia won their 15th title.

Format
Sixteen teams participated in the 1986–87 Cypriot First Division. All teams played against each other twice, once at their home and once away. The team with the most points at the end of the season crowned champions. The last two teams were relegated to the 1987–88 Cypriot Second Division.

The champions ensured their participation in the 1987–88 European Cup and the runners-up in the 1987–88 UEFA Cup.

Changes from previous season
No team was relegated from the previous season. The first two teams of the 1985–86 Cypriot Second Division, Ethnikos Achna and Omonia Aradippou were promoted and added to the First Division.

Stadia and locations

League standings

Results

See also
 Cypriot First Division
 1986–87 Cypriot Cup
 List of top goalscorers in Cypriot First Division by season
 Cypriot football clubs in European competitions

References

Sources

Cypriot First Division seasons
Cyprus
1986–87 in Cypriot football